Lorenza Böttner (6 March 1959 – January 1994) was a disabled transgender multidisciplinary visual artist. Born in Chile, she later moved to Germany following the amputation of both of her arms, where she studied and began a career in art. Using several art media, including performance pieces, she depicted social outcasts, and she portrayed Petra during opening and the closing ceremonies at the 1992 Summer Paralympics. She died of AIDS-related complications in Munich. Following her death, little of her art was publicly shown until documenta and Paul B. Preciado began showing her work from 2016 onward.

Early life 
Little is known about Lorenza Böttner's early life. She was born on 6 March 1959 in Punta Arenas, Chile, to parents of German descent. At the age of eight, both of her arms were amputated after she received an electric shock from power lines. The Chilean children's magazine  depicted her as an exemplar for other children: Despite losing her arms, the magazine said, she was able to use Christian language with others, persevere through her difficulties, and draw with a pencil in her mouth. Six years after her amputation, she moved with her parents to Lichtenau, Germany, for better health services. She refused to use prosthetics and had a series of surgeries beginning in 1973.

Career 

Böttner attended the Kassel School of Arts, and while there, began publicly identifying as a woman. Art school allowed her to begin a series of photographs, where she would wear makeup that modified the appearance of her face, following a comment from a professor that she was a "walking performance". She graduated from school in 1984 after completing a thesis called "Behindert!?"—literally meaning "Disabled?!"—which used historical and medical motifs of disability in its accompanying performance piece. She also studied art in New York.

Over the course of her career, her art widely varied in style and form, ranging from drawings to paintings to performances. Describing her approach as "transition and not identity", the philosopher and art curator Paul B. Preciado says that while she used her feet and mouth to paint, the unique habitation of her body (transgender and disabled) allowed her to create an interdisciplinary movement, not only visual or performance. She depicted herself in art, as well as the armless Venus de Milo and what Preciado describes as "subaltern" persons: prostitutes in Europe, African Americans experiencing police violence in America, and lesbian and gay sexuality. In the work depicting herself, she is shown as both sexual and maternal, and as the art critic Prathap Nair says, this works to unsettle one's understanding of the gender binary. Similarly, documenta said her "dissident transgender body" allowed her to become "a living political sculpture, a sculptural manifesto". She explained in 1991 that the purpose of using armless statues, especially the Venus de Milo, was to "show the beauty of a mutilated body ... despite not having arms". 

In 1992, after making a series of connections in the artistic scene of Barcelona and joining the Disabled Artists Network, she portrayed the mascot Petra at that year's paralympic games held in the city. Her performances—where she handled artistic equipment between her toes—were displayed in cities throughout the world, such as in New York.

Death and legacy
Böttner died of AIDS-related complications in Munich in January 1994.

The Chilean writers Roberto Bolaño and Pedro Lemebel wrote about Böttner in their novels Estrella Distante (1996) and Loco Afán (1996), respectively. Both of these writers used her life to advance a political theory of Chilean artistry. For her early life, Bolaño indicated that while still in Chile, she held secret street performances to save money to leave for Germany, even though she had left with her parents at 14; for her adult life, he said that she attempted to commit suicide, even though such an attempt never took place. According to Latin American studies scholar Carl Fischer, Bolaño's writing focused more on "what she failed at and hid" than "what she revealed", and he used her to demonstrate the types of people he thought were excluded from the Chilean literary canon. For Lemebel, Böttner served as one of his  (chronicles) of LGBT life in the dictatorship of Augusto Pinochet, able to resist heterosexism and militarism through her "unfolding" of gender expectations.

She was a central character in scenes of Frank Garvey's film Wall of Ashes (2009), where she easily cleaned and refilled a pot using her feet. According to Fischer, Böttner saw carrying out normal actions (such as cleaning dishes) as her principal art form, since ones perception of her disability forced her to become a kind of exhibitionist in doing everyday tasks. She wished to "open people's eyes and show them how stupid it is to hide behind a bourgeois façade" through her life. In Michael Stahlberg's documentary Lorenza (1991), she orders cheese from a clerk, only for the camera to cut out when she is due to take them. For Fischer, this precisely demonstrates Böttner's artistic milieu: She exhibits "quotidian" actions, while also leaving some questions entirely unresolved.

In 2016, documenta in Kassel, Germany, began a public showing of her art. From 2018 onward, Preciado held a series of events showcasing Böttner's work in locations such as La Virreina Centre de la Imatge in Barcelona and the Württembergischer Kunstverein in Stuttgart. The exhibitions of documenta and Preciado marked the first time much of her work had been publicly seen in decades.

References

Citations

Bibliography

External links
 Every life matters: The work of Lorenza Böttner by Paul B. Preciado at the 2018 conference "Hold Me Now – Feel and Touch in an Unreal World".
 Lorenza Böttner y los mitones negros by Edgar Ariel at Hypermedia Magazine in 2021.
Réquiem por la norma at La Virreina Centre de la Imatge, Barcelona (in Spanish), with photographs of the exhibition

1959 births
1994 deaths
20th-century Chilean LGBT people
AIDS-related deaths in Germany
German amputees
Chilean emigrants to Germany
Mouth and foot painting artists
Transgender painters
German LGBT painters